Ye Yint Thet Zwe (born 1965) is a Burmese poet currently based in Helsinki.

Biography
In 1990, he left Burma (also known as Myanmar) for political reasons and has lived in Thailand, Malaysia, Singapore, Japan and Finland, his current home.

In Tokyo, Ye Yint founded the independent Burmese library Ahara with the help of other writers as a way to preserve their heritage. He was also editor of Ahara magazine, second chairman of the Burmese Workers Union in Japan, part of the Burma Media Association, and a supporter member of the student army of the Myanmar and Thailand border (ABSDF).

Ye Yint has also been an editor, journalist and photographer for the Burma Today News Media based in New York City, and poetry collaborator for MMM Media, Yoma 3 News Media, Dawn O Way Magazine and Moe Makha Online Media Magazine. Works by Ye Yint have been included in poetry compilations such as 5 flowers, 8888 commemoration, Saffron revolution and The Sorrows of European Nights Suffering.

Ye Yint has been very active in the literary community, participating in many experimental literary events and slam poetry festivals in Finland. In 2015, he was invited to the Runokuu (Poetry Moon) international poetry festival in Helsinki, reading his work in collaboration with the electronic musicians Romulus Chiciuk and Alejandro Montes de Oca.

Ye Yint Thet Zwe's poetry was the subject of the film The Journey of a Broken Bird directed by Mexican engineer and photographer Jaime Culebro. The film, released in 2016, tells the story of Julia and Ye Yint's journey over the streets of Helsinki.

Bibliography

Poetry
 We Hate War, Mother (2016, Helsinki) (Karu Kartonera, Sivuvalo Project).

References

Burmese writers
Burmese journalists
Burmese male poets
20th-century Burmese poets
1965 births
Living people
20th-century male writers